Tropiderini is a tribe of fungus weevils in the family of beetles known as Anthribidae. There are at least two genera and about five described species in Tropiderini.

Genera
These two genera belong to the tribe Tropiderini:
 Eurymycter LeConte, 1876 i c g b
 Gonotropis LeConte, 1876 i c g b

Data sources: i = ITIS, c = Catalogue of Life, g = GBIF, b = Bugguide.net

References

Further reading

External links
 

Anthribidae